Ioan Neag (born 18 February 1994) is a Romanian footballer who plays as a centre back for Unirea Alba Iulia.

Club career
Neag started playing football at CSȘ Sebeș. In 2008, he was spotted by Ardealul Cluj's trainer, Mihai Georgescu, at a competition that was organised by the Romanian Football Federation for 14-year-old players. Georgescu brought Neag to Ardealul and in 2010, together with other teammates, he joined Universitatea Cluj. He made his debut in Liga I on 15 May 2012, in a match against Voința Sibiu.

In 2012, Universitatea Cluj's owner, Florian Walter transferred most of the team's players at Petrolul Ploiești, including Ionuț Neag. The player spent one season at Petrolul Ploiești and returned to Universitatea Cluj in 2013.

International career
Neag made his debut for Romania U-17 on 24 March 2011 in a game against Iceland U-17. He was part of the squad that played for the Romania under-17 national team that took part in the 2011 UEFA European Under-17 Football Championship, but didn't play a game.

Honours
Petrolul Ploieşti 
Cupa României (1): 2012–13

References

External links
 
 

People from Alba County
1994 births
Living people
Romanian footballers
Association football defenders
Liga I players
Liga II players
FC Universitatea Cluj players
FC Petrolul Ploiești players
CS Gaz Metan Mediaș players
SCM Râmnicu Vâlcea players
ASC Daco-Getica București players
ACS Viitorul Târgu Jiu players
CSM Unirea Alba Iulia players